Puligo is a surname. Notable people with the surname include:

Domenico Puligo (1492–1527), Italian painter 
Jacone Puligo, 16th-century Italian painter